Gustav Adolf Hippius (12 March 1792, Nissi Parish - 6 October 1856, Reval) was a Baltic-German portrait painter and lithographer.

Life and work 
His father, was an evangelical chaplain. He lost his mother at an early age, and was sent to a boarding house in Reval. While there, he became lifelong friends with Otto Friedrich Ignatius, another aspiring artist and son of the school's founder. His friends helped him stage an exhibition, which earned him enough money to study in Prague. He then studied copper engraving at the Academy of Fine Arts, Vienna, from 1813 to 1815.

In 1816, he and his friend, travelled through Salzburg, Munich, Venice and Florence; arriving in Rome in  the Spring of 1817. He lived there for two years, and became associated with members of the Nazarene movement, including  Johann Friedrich Overbeck, who became a good friend. He produced numerous portraits there; notably one of Beethoven, which is now at the Beethoven House in Bonn. After leaving there, he stopped in Switzerland before returning home.

In 1820, he married Ignatius' sister, Friederike (1798-1886). Shortly after, they moved to Saint Petersburg, where he worked as a portrait painter.

When Ignatius died in 1824, he left a major mural at the church in Tsarskoye Selo unfinished. Hippius completed it in 1825. This helped bring his works to the attention of Georg von Engelhardt, former Director of the Tsarskoye Selo Lyceum, who offered him financial support and helped him to publish one of his most important works; Contemporaries. A Collection of lithographed portraits of government officials, writers and artists. Dedicated to H. I. V. Emperor Alexander I.

He also worked as a drawing teacher; at the "" and the Elizabethan Institute, as well as publishing several instructional manuals. He returned to Estonia in 1849, and settled in Reval, where he continued to produce portraits, including a series of women in traditional costumes. He died in 1856 and was buried in Hageri, near his birthplace.

Sources
 Eesti elulood (Estonian Biographies), Eesti entsüklopeediakirjastus, Tallinn 2000 , pg.91
 P. Ettinger: "Hippius, Gustav Adolf". In: Hans Vollmer (Ed.): Allgemeines Lexikon der Bildenden Künstler von der Antike bis zur Gegenwart, Vol.17: Heubel–Hubard. E. A. Seemann, Leipzig 1924, pp. 123–124
 Entry on Hippius @ the Baltische Historische Kommission
 Anne Lõugas, Neli baltisaksa kunstnikku: Carl Siegismund Walther, Friedrich Ludwig von Maydell, August Georg Wilhelm Pezold, Gustav Adolf Hippius, Tallinna Raamatutrükikoda, 1994  
 " Гиппиус, Густав Фомич" (Hippius, Gustav Fomich), by N. P. Chulkov, from the Russian Biographical Dictionary, @ Russian Wikisource

External links 

 Works by Hippius in the collection of the Estnischen Kunstmuseums

1792 births
1856 deaths
Russian painters
Baltic German people from the Russian Empire
Russian portrait painters
Academy of Fine Arts Vienna alumni
People from Saue Parish